William James Riley (born September 20, 1950) is a Canadian former professional ice hockey player, and was the third black player in the National Hockey League (NHL). He played for the Washington Capitals and Winnipeg Jets between 1974 and 1980. The rest of his career, which lasted from 1974 to 1984, was spent in the minor leagues.

Early life
Riley's mother worked as a cleaning lady, while his father earned the minimum wage of $1.25 per hour. With limited finances, they made the necessary sacrifices to outfit their son with the required equipment to play hockey starting in peewee. Riley stuck with the game in spite of the absence of many black role models in the sport. After two seasons with the Amherst Ramblers, a team he would go on to coach many years later, he held no aspirations of pursuing hockey as a big-league career.

In 1973 while working in a factory and playing senior hockey with the Kitimat Eagles senior team in the Pacific Northwest Hockey League in British Columbia, Riley was discovered after putting up 206 points in 80 games across two seasons. Future NHL coach Tom McVie was in the process of fortifying his lineup for the Dayton Gems of the International Hockey League (IHL). He discovered Riley in Kitimat and invited him for a tryout. Riley accepted and made the club in 1974.

Career
Riley was given a tryout with the Washington Capitals during their inaugural season in 1974-75 and played in one game, but he spent most of his time in the minors, primarily with the Dayton Gems. It was during this time that he was reunited with and played under future Capitals' coach McVie. He would eventually be signed as a free agent by the Capitals during the 1976–77 NHL season and played for the Capitals in parts of the next three seasons.

Riley was claimed by the Winnipeg Jets in the 1979 NHL Expansion Draft, but only played in 14 games before he was sent to the minors, where he played, with the New Brunswick Hawks, Moncton Alpines and the Nova Scotia Voyageurs, until he retired following the 1983–84 season.

Riley was player-coach and captain of the St. John's Capitals of the Newfoundland Senior Hockey League for three seasons during the late 1980s.

Coaching career
After retiring from professional play, Riley returned to coaching in 1989-90, when he landed a head coaching position with the Amherst Ramblers of the Maritime Junior A Hockey League. Later, he was the head coach, general manager and director of player personnel of the Miramichi Timberwolves of the Maritime Junior A Hockey League. He also served as head coach of the Moncton Wildcats during the 1996–97 season, finishing with a 16–52–2 record.

Personal life
Riley was roommates with Dave Feamster, and together they once poached a deer, to provide meat for Riley and his family.

Riley's son, Billy Jr., was killed in a motor vehicle accident in 2011 in Moncton at age 35.

In 2017, after seeing a segment on Hockey Night in Canada about Toronto Maple Leafs legend Bill Barilko, Riley sent his daughter Tracey, who lived in Timmins, to the site of Barilko's grave to clean his tombstone.

Awards and honours

• Calder Cup (As a player) - 1982

• Callaghan Cup (As a coach) - 1990

• Nova Scotia Sport Hall of Fame - 1998

• Number 8 jersey retired by Amherst Ramblers - 2013

Career statistics

Regular season and playoffs

References

External links

1950 births
Living people
Black Canadian ice hockey players
Black Nova Scotians
Canadian ice hockey coaches
Canadian ice hockey right wingers
Dayton Gems players
Hershey Bears players
Ice hockey people from Nova Scotia
Moncton Alpines (AHL) players
Moncton Wildcats coaches
New Brunswick Hawks players
Nova Scotia Voyageurs players
People from Amherst, Nova Scotia
Undrafted National Hockey League players
Washington Capitals players
Winnipeg Jets (1979–1996) players
People from Cumberland County, Nova Scotia